Specular Interactive, Inc. is an arcade game entertainment company based in Foothill Ranch, California. It is best known for developing arcade games H2Overdrive, Dirty Drivin', and Batman (2013 arcade game).

History

Specular Interactive was formed in early 2007 by Steve Ranck. Before Specular, Steve founded Swingin’ Ape Studios.

It was announced in November 2007 that Specular Interactive had signed an agreement with Raw Thrills to create a premium coin-operated arcade game. Under the agreement, Specular Interactive would design and develop the game while Raw Thrills will manufacture and publish the game worldwide.

The company's first game was H2Overdrive, followed by Dirty Drivin'
. In 2013, Specular Interactive teamed with Raw Thrills and Warner Bros. to release Batman (2013 arcade video game).

The company has been interested in developing a sequel to Metal Arms: Glitch in the System
as the team at Specular was behind the cult favorite.

Games
H2Overdrive (2009)
Dirty Drivin' (2011)
Batman (2013 arcade video game) (2013)

References

External links
Specular Interactive website

Video game companies of the United States
Video game companies established in 2007
2007 establishments in California
Companies based in Lake Forest, California